Rascal or rascals may refer to:

Arts and entertainment
 Rascal (book), a 1963 children's book by Sterling North
 Rascal (film), a 1969 Walt Disney adaptation of Sterling North's book
 Rascals (1938 film), an American comedy-drama
 Rascals (2011 film), an Indian action-comedy film
 "Rascals" (Star Trek: The Next Generation)
 Dizzee Rascal (born 1984), English rapper
 The Rascals (English band), a rock band from the Hoylake, England
 The Rascals, an American blue-eyed soul group
 The Rascals (producers), a music production duo
 "Rascal" (song), 2020
 "Rascal (Superstar)", a song by Tinashe
 Rascal (video game), a 1998 game for the Sony PlayStation

Military uses
 Rascal (artillery), a lightweight mobile artillery system
 GAM-63 RASCAL, a supersonic air-to-surface missile
 UH-60A RASCAL, a special-purpose Sikorsky UH-60 Black Hawk helicopter

Technology
 Rascal (single-board computer), small open source computer that runs Linux
 RascalMPL, an experimental domain-specific language for metaprogramming
 Rascal 14, an American sailboat design
 The Rascal Company, maker of a brand of mobility scooter

Other uses
 River City Rascals, a professional baseball team based in O'Fallon, Missouri
 Bedford Rascal, a GM/Suzuki microvan

See also
 The Little Rascals (disambiguation)
 Rascalz, Canadian hip hop group
 The Rascalz, professional wrestling stable
 Raskol gangs, urban gangs in Papua New Guinea
 RASCLS